Margaret Pemberton (née Hudson; born 10 April 1943) is a British writer of women's fiction since 1975. Beside her married name Margaret Pemberton, her writings have been published under her maiden name Maggie Hudson and the pseudonyms Carris Carlisle,  Christina Harland, and Rebecca Dean.

A former chairman of the Romantic Novelists' Association (1989–91) she has written novels in many different genres; romantic suspense, historical sagas, contemporary sagas and crime. Having travelled extensively, her novels are set in many different parts of the world.

Biography
Pemberton was born Margaret Hudson on 10 April 1943 in Bradford, Yorkshire, England, daughter of Kathleen (Ramsden), an artist, and George Arthur Hudson, an architect.

Married with Mike Pemberton, she has five adult children and lives in Whitstable, Kent, with her husband, and two small dogs.

Pemberton was the fifteenth Chairman of the Romantic Novelists' Association from 1989 to 1991 and also served on the Crime Writers' Association Committee.

Published books

As Margaret Pemberton
Romantic suspense

Rendezvous with Danger (1975) aka The Girl Who Knew Too Much
Mystery of Saligo Bay (1976) aka The Last Letter
The Guilty Secret (1979) aka A Dark Enchantment
Tapestry of Fear (1979)
Vengeance in the Sun (1980) aka The Villa d'Este

Historical romance
Lion of Languedoc (1981)
Pioneer Girl (1982) aka A Many-Splendoured Thing
African Enchantment (1982)
Flight to Verechenko (1983) aka A Rebellious Heart
Devil's Palace (1983) aka The Reckless Miss Grainger 
Moonflower Madness (1993)
Forget-me-Not Bride (1994)

Nightshades
Forever (1982) aka Undying Love

Period sagas
Silver Shadows, Golden Dreams (1985) aka Goddess
Never Leave Me (1986) aka The Violins of Autumn
A Multitude of Sins (1998) aka A Time to Remember
White Christmas in Saigon (1990)
An Embarrassment of Riches (1992)
Zadruga (1994)
 The Londoners trilogy
The Londoners (1995)
Magnolia Square (1996)
Coronation Summer (1997)
Yorkshire Rose (1997)
Harlot (1998) aka The Far Morning
Yorkshire Rose (1997)
The Four of Us (2004)A Season of Secrets (2015)Beneath the Cypress Tree (2017)

As Carris CarlisleParty in Peking (1987) aka From China With LoveAs Christina HarlandWaiting Wives (1991)

As Maggie Hudson
NovelsTell Me No Secrets (1999)Fast Women (2000)Looking for Mr Big (2001)Nowhere to Run (2002)

As Rebecca Dean
NovelsEnemies of the Heart (2008)Palace Circle (2009)The Golden Prince (2010)The Shadow Queen (2012) aka Wallis'' (2012)

References

External links
  under that name

1943 births
English romantic fiction writers
Writers from Bradford
Living people